Michael Lucas is the name of:

 Michael Lucas, 2nd Baron Lucas of Chilworth (1926–2001), British peer and Conservative politician
 Michael Lucas (political activist) (1926—2020), artist, designer, and political activist
 Mike Lucas (cricketer) (born 1944), Australian cricketer
 Mike Lucas (born 1959), football coach
 Michael Lucas (director) (born 1972), performer in and director of gay pornographic films
 Michael Lucas, Australian screenwriter and producer, writer of TV series The Newsreader (2021)

See also
 Michael Lukas (born 1983), Swiss bobsledder
 Michael David Lukas (born 1979), author